Vic Seixas and Doris Hart successfully defended their title, defeating Ken Rosewall and Margaret duPont in the final, 5–7, 6–4, 6–3 to win the mixed doubles tennis title at the 1954 Wimbledon Championships.

Seeds

  Vic Seixas /  Doris Hart (champions)
  Lew Hoad /  Maureen Connolly (semifinals)
  Ken Rosewall /  Margaret duPont (final)
  Rex Hartwig /  Betty Pratt (quarterfinals)

Draw

Finals

Top half

Section 1

Section 2

Section 3

Section 4

Bottom half

Section 5

Section 6

Section 7

Section 8

References

External links

X=Mixed Doubles
Wimbledon Championship by year – Mixed doubles